Joseph Hamburger (1922 – August 21, 1997) was an American historian.

His academic career at Yale University spanned 35 years, from 1957 to 1992. In 1990 he was appointed the Pelatiah Perit Professor of Political and Social Science. His work focused on nineteenth century Britain, with studies on James Mill, John Stuart Mill and Thomas Macaulay. His obituarists claimed that he made an immense contribution to historical knowledge through his work on nineteenth century intellectual history and called him a sturdy advocate of "the fundamental principles of individual liberty and representative democracy".

Works
James Mill and the Art of Revolution (Yale: Yale University Press, 1963).
Intellectuals in Politics: John Stuart Mill and the Philosophic Radicals, Volume 14 (Yale: Yale University Press, 1965).
Macaulay and the Whig Tradition (Chicago: University of Chicago Press, 1976).
John Stuart Mill on Liberty and Control (Princeton: Princeton University Press, 1999).

Notes

1922 births
1997 deaths
20th-century American historians
American male non-fiction writers
Intellectual historians
Yale University faculty
20th-century American male writers